William H. J. Davies (birth unknown – death unknown) was a Welsh rugby union, and professional rugby league footballer who played in the 1930s.

Playing career

International honours
Billy Davies won a cap for Great Britain (RL) while at Castleford in 1933 against Australia.

County League appearances
Billy Davies played in Castleford's victory in the Yorkshire County League during the 1932–33 season.

Challenge Cup Final appearances
Billy Davies played  in Castleford's 11–8 victory over Huddersfield in the 1935 Challenge Cup Final during the 1934–35 season at Wembley Stadium, London on Saturday 4 May 1935, in front of a crowd of 39,000.

Club career
Billy Davies made his début for Featherstone Rovers on Saturday 2 October 1937.

Note
William Davies' middle initial is variously stated as being 'H' (thecastlefordtigers.co.uk), or 'J' (rugbyleagueproject.org, and Featherstone Rovers printed references).

References

External links
!Great Britain Statistics at englandrl.co.uk (statistics currently missing due to not having appeared for both Great Britain, and England)

Castleford Tigers players
Featherstone Rovers players
Great Britain national rugby league team players
Llanelli RFC players
Place of birth missing
Place of death missing
Rugby league five-eighths
Welsh rugby league players
Welsh rugby union players
Year of birth missing
Year of death missing